Lartee Jackson (born October 5, 1980) is a Liberian former footballer who last played Invincible Eleven. He was also a member of the Liberia national football team.

References

External links 
 

1980 births
Living people
Liberian footballers
Association football goalkeepers
Liberia international footballers
Invincible Eleven players